Tantalum(III) chloride or tantalum trichloride is non-stoichiometric with a range of composition from TaCl2.9 to TaCl3.1  Anionic and neutral clusters containing Ta(III) chloride include [Ta6Cl18]4− and [Ta6Cl14](H2O)4.

Formation
Tantalum(III) chloride is formed by reducing tantalum(V) chloride with tantalum metal. this is done by heating tantalum(III) chloride to 305 °C, passing the vapour over tantalum foil at 600°, and condensing the trichloride at 365 °C. If the condensing region is kept at too high a temperature, then TaCl2.5 deposits instead.

The trichloride can also be prepared by thermal decomposition of TaCl4, with removal of volatile TaCl5. TaCl5 can be vapourised leaving behind TaCl3.

"Salt-free reduction" of a toluene solution of TaCl5 with 1,4-disilyl-cyclohexadiene in the presence of ethylene produces a complex of TaCl3:

Properties
Above 500 °C, TaCl3 disproportionates further releasing TaCl5. TaCl3 is insoluble in room temperature water, or dilute acid, but dissolves in boiling water. A blue-green solution is formed.

Complexes
Tantalum(III) chloride can form complexes with some ligands as a monomer or dimer.

Complexes include Ta(=C-CMe3)(PMe3)2Cl3, [TaCl3(P(CH2C6H5)3THF]2μ-N2 and [TaCl3THF2]2μ-N2 (dinitrogen complexes).

As a dimer, complexes include Ta2Cl6(SC4H8)3 (SC4H8=tetrahydrothiophene). Ta2Cl6(SMe2)3, Ta2Cl6(thiane)3 and Ta2Cl6(thiolane)3 have a double bond between the two tantalum atoms, and two bridging chlorides, and a bridging ligand.

References

Tantalum compounds
Chlorides
Non-stoichiometric compounds